Gone to the Moon is the fourth and final album by British new wave band Kajagoogoo. It was recorded in 2007 and early 2008 shortly before the original band was officially reunited.  The tour for the album featured the entire original band. The album was downloadable on MP3 format for free until February 2009 and released shortly after on CD-R. The song "Tears" was featured on the compilation album This Is Not Retro – This Is the Eighties Up to Date.

Track listing
All tracks written by Steve Askew, Nick Beggs, and Stuart Neale.

"Gone to the Moon" – 5:32
"Smile" – 4:00
"Tracy" – 5:19
"Moon in Motion" – 1:45
"First Girl on Mars" – 4:39
"Tears" – 4:11
"The Last Day" – 5:31
"Excerpts from the Falling Man" – 1:23
"Table for One" – 4:35
"Nightingales" – 4:16
"Spring's Eternal Dance" – 1:33
"Rocket Boy" – 4:20

Personnel 
Kajagoogoo
 Nick Beggs – vocals, bass guitar, tambourine, programming
 Steve Askew – acoustic guitar, electric guitar, programming
 Stuart Neale – keyboards, programming

Additional musicians
 Jonathan Atkinson – drums
 Anna Conti – flute

Technical
 Mark Downie – producer, mixing, mastering
 Kajagoogoo – production and mixing (tracks 1, 6, 12)
 Ettienne – artwork
 Andreas Horvath – artwork
 Atoman – artwork

External links
 KajaFax - The Officially Approved Kajagoogoo Community & Fan Club
 Unofficial Limahl & Kajagoogoo YouTube video archives

2008 albums
Kajagoogoo albums